A sidewalk cafe or pavement cafe is "a portion of an eating or drinking place, located on a public sidewalk, that provides waiter or waitress service" (as defined by the American Planning Association based upon the New York City planning regulations); the area is used solely for dining.
Sidewalk cafes are of two types: enclosed and unenclosed, the former being surrounded by a single-story structure and the latter being an area of the sidewalk that contains removable tables, chairs, and railings. 

Sidewalk cafes are common across Europe, forming an important part of street life in countries such as Spain, France and Italy.

New York City 

New York City regulations control in what areas sidewalk cafes can exist, their construction, and what parts of a sidewalk they can occupy. Proprietors pay a license fee, which is effectively rent paid to the city for the use of the sidewalk.

From 1988 these regulations were a zoning resolution of the New York City Department of City Planning. The 1988 resolution prohibited sidewalk cafes in residential areas and on major thoroughfares, permitting them in malls and (conditionally) "in Historic Districts or in designated Landmark Buildings". The stated purposes are to balance the cafe proprietors' interests against the needs of pedestrians; to conserve the value of land; and to preserve the characters of neighborhoods.

Until 2003 the process for obtaining a license for a sidewalk cafe involved so many city agencies and such a long wait time that the law was regularly flouted, with restaurateurs considering it cheaper to just erect sidewalk cafes and pay the fines after the fact. New approval processes were adopted in that year, shortening the process to 140 days and making it the sole responsibility of the city's Department of Consumer Affairs.

The COVID-19 pandemic in New York City forced restaurants to close their dining rooms. They received emergency permission to operate al fresco dining areas in streets. By September 2020, 10,600 restaurants had enrolled in the city's outdoor dining program, compared to just 1,023 sidewalk cafes that existed before the pandemic. Additionally, many restaurants started installing outdoor dining structures called bubble pods to promote social distancing. These semispherical or igloo shaped structures became quite common during the pandemic. While, they've been criticized for not having a proper ventilation system in place and safety concerns, some experts believe that if properly ventilated and cleaned between diners these enclosures could be considered safe.

References

Sources

Further reading 
Ramati, Raquel.  How to Save Your Own Street, Dolphin Books, 1981
 

Outdoor structures
Types of coffeehouses and cafés
Sidewalks